The 1934 All-Ireland Senior Camogie Championship Final was the 3rd All-Ireland Final and the deciding match of the 1934 All-Ireland Senior Camogie Championship, an inter-county camogie tournament for the top teams in Ireland.

K. McCarthy scored a goal and Cork led 1-2 to 0-0 at half-time, and they won easily in the end.

References

All-Ireland Senior Camogie Championship Final
All-Ireland Senior Camogie Championship Final, 1934
All-Ireland Senior Camogie Championship Final
All-Ireland Senior Camogie Championship Finals
Cork county camogie team matches